The list of shipwrecks in May 1828 includes all ships sunk, foundered, grounded, or otherwise lost during May 1828.

6 May

9 May

10 May

11 May

14 May

15 May

16 May

17 May

18 May

19 May

20 May

22 May

23 May

24 May

25 May

26 May

Unknown date

References

1828-05